Battered Bruised & Bloody is the second studio album by Guatemalan-American DJ and record producer Carnage. It was released on April 13, 2018 through Heavyweight Records. The album features guest appearances by Migos, Lil Pump, Mac Miller, Kyle, among others.

Singles 
The first single, "Learn How to Watch" featuring Mac Miller and MadeinTYO, was released on January 12, 2018. The official music video was uploaded on Cole Bennett's YouTube channel the next day.

The second single, "I Shyne" featuring Lil Pump, was released on January 18, 2018. The official lyric video was uploaded on Carnage's official YouTube channel on January 29, 2018.

The third single, "Plur Genocide" featuring Steve Aoki and Lockdown, was released on February 23, 2018. The official music video was also uploaded on Carnage's YouTube channel the same day.

Track listing 

All tracks are produced by Carnage, except where noted.

References 

Carnage (DJ) albums
2018 albums